Gérard Lanvin (born 21 June 1950) is a César Award-winning French actor.  He quit his studies when he was 17 to become an actor. He took on a role in Vous n'aurez pas l'Alsace et la Lorraine in 1977 on an offer from the actor Coluche. He received the Prix Jean Gabin in 1982 for his role in Une étrange affaire. In 1995 he won a César Award for Best Actor with Le Fils préféré. Other appearances include Une semaine de vacances and 3 zéros. During the 2000s, he returned to the big screen with popular comedies. In 2001, he received the César Award for Best Actor in a Supporting Role with The Taste of Others (Le Goût des autres). He is married to Chantal Benoist, an actress, model and singer who released disco albums in 70s/80s under the name "Jennifer".

Selected filmography

Discography

Albums

References

External links 

 
Allociné page (French)

1950 births
Living people
People from Boulogne-Billancourt
Best Actor César Award winners
French male film actors
French male television actors
French male voice actors
20th-century French male actors
21st-century French male actors
Cours Florent alumni
Best Supporting Actor César Award winners
Prix Fénéon winners